Compulsion (2001) is a horror novel written by Shaun Hutson.

Plot summary
A gang of teenage youngsters is running riot on the streets. Responsible for a number of burglaries and car thefts, the police are at their wits' end trying to put a stop to the gang's activities. Terror and hatred have become part of everyday life for local residents and, just when it seems things cannot get any worse, the gang targets Shelby House – an old people's home. Supervisor Veronica Porter, her two staff and the nine elderly residents become the gang's most vulnerable victims yet as the thugs conduct a hate campaign against them, sending abusive mail, daubing graffiti on walls and shattering windows. The intimidation escalates until Veronica's own father is dragged into the scene of terror when, disturbing some of the gang members burgling his house he is put into a coma. But enough is enough. The senior citizens of Shelby House decide to take the law into their own hands and fight back.

External links
The official Shaun Hutson website, run by a fan with the input of the author himself

2001 British novels
British horror novels